The Bhopal - Khajuraho Mahamana Superfast Express is a superfast train belonging to West Central Railway zone that runs between Bhopal Junction and Khajuraho in India. It is the only connection between Bhopal and Khajuraho. It is currently being operated with 22163/22164 train numbers on a daily basis.

Service

The 22163/Bhopal - Khajuraho Mahamana SF Express has an average speed of 55 km/hr and covers 367 km in 6 hrs 40 mins. 22164/Khajuraho - Bhopal Mahamana SF Express has an average speed of 55 km/hr and covers 367 km in 6 hrs 40 mins.

Route & Halts 

The important halts of the train are:

Coach composite

The train has standard LHB rakes with max speed of 130 kmph. The train consists of 10 coaches :

 1 AC III Chair Car
 9 Chair Car
 2 General
 2 Seating cum Luggage Rake

Traction

Both trains are hauled by an Itarsi based WDP 4D Diesel locomotive from Bhopal to Khajuraho and vice versa.

See also 

 Bhopal Junction railway station
 Khajuraho railway station
 Mahamana Express
 Bhopal–Bina Passenger
 Bhopal – Pratapgarh Express (via Lucknow)

Notes

External links 

 22163/Bhopal - Khajuraho SF Express
 22164/Khajuraho - Bhopal SF Express

References 

Transport in Bhopal
Transport in Khajuraho
Mahamana Express trains
Rail transport in Madhya Pradesh
Railway services introduced in 2017
Memorials to Madan Mohan Malaviya